STEAP family member 4 is a protein that in humans is encoded by the STEAP4 gene.

Function 

The protein encoded by this gene belongs to the STEAP (six transmembrane epithelial antigen of prostate) family, and resides in the golgi apparatus. It functions as a metalloreductase that has the ability to reduce both Fe(3+) to Fe(2+) and Cu(2+) to Cu(1+), using NAD(+) as acceptor. Studies in mice and human suggest that this gene may be involved in adipocyte development and metabolism, and may contribute to the normal biology of the prostate cell, as well as prostate cancer progression. Alternatively spliced transcript variants encoding different isoforms have been found for this gene

References

Further reading 

 
 
 
 
 
 
 
 
 

Genes on human chromosome 7